Fylingthorpe is a village in the civil parish of Fylingdales in the Borough of Scarborough in North Yorkshire, England.

Geography 

The country rises sharply west of the village itself towards Fyling Hall school by about 100 m in 1 km.

The underlying geology is boulder clay.

History 

Fylingthorpe, then an agglomeration-type settlement, is reported in the Domesday Book of 1086 as "waste" and non-populated. It came under the jurisdiction of William de Percy who between 1091 and 1096 granted it to Whitby Abbey.

The village was originally only known as Thorpe and in the 13th century as Prestethorpe.

The Fawside family, who originated in Scotland and accompanied King James I, had Thorpe Hall mansion built in 1680. They later changed their name into Farsyde and, as lords of Fylingdales Manor, were involved in various conflicts of political, religious, and military nature. They were also involved in shipping and smuggling.

In 1923, the boarding school of Fyling Hall was founded in a Georgian country house near the village. It is still in operation.

Notable buildings 

Thorpe Hall, an Elizabethan mansion built by the Fawside family in 1680 and extended twice in the 19th century, now serves as bed and breakfast accommodation.

The Georgian country house of Fyling Hall, built in 1810 and now the home of Fyling Hall School, replaced an earlier hall where in 1632 the politician Sir Hugh Cholmeley was born.

St Stephen's Old Church north of the village, a chapel of ease which contains memorials for shipwrecked sailors, was built in 1821 as a preaching church, replacing a predecessor. It is a Grade I listed building.

The "Pigsty" is an architectural folly south of Fyling Hall, built in the late 19th century as pig stables in a neoclassical style by John Barry, a shipowner and resident of the mansion, and is now rented out as holiday accommodation by the Landmark Trust.

References

Further reading 
 Robin Lidster: Robin Hood's Bay and Fylingthorpe Through Time. Amberley Publishing 2009. 96 pages. .

Villages in North Yorkshire
Tourist attractions in North Yorkshire
Populated coastal places in North Yorkshire